The 1991-92 Four Hills Tournament took place at the four traditional venues of Oberstdorf, Garmisch-Partenkirchen, Innsbruck and Bischofshofen, located in Germany and Austria, between 29 December 1991 and 6 January 1992.

Results

Overall

References

External links 
 Official website 

Four Hills Tournament
1991 in ski jumping
1992 in ski jumping
1991 in German sport
1992 in German sport
1992 in Austrian sport
Four Hills Tournament
Four Hills Tournament